David Weinstein may refer to:
David E. Weinstein (born 1964), American economist
David F. Weinstein (born 1936), American politician
David Weinstein (musician) (born 1954), American musician and composer
Dave Weinstein (born 1988), American cybersecurity consultant